Air Albania is the flag carrier of Albania. The airline maintains its hub and company headquarters at the Tirana International Airport Nënë Tereza in Tirana, Albania. Founded in 2018, it operates scheduled air services for passengers to thirteen destinations in Europe.

History

Early years 
Albania's previous national flag carrier airline, Albanian Airlines, was rendered defunct when the Albanian government revoked its license to operate in Albania on 11 November 2011.

Albanian Prime Minister Edi Rama announced on 30 March 2017 that the Albanian government was planning to create an airline in Albania in partnership with Turkish Airlines. On 8 May 2017, Rama and İlker Aycı, executive director of Turkish Airlines, released a joint press statement, declaring that an Albania-based airline was in the works, with support from Turkish president Recep Tayyip Erdoğan. It was later announced that Air Albania's founding was tied to the creation of an international airport in Vlorë, also planned in cooperation with the Turkish government. Rama unveiled the name of the new airline, Air Albania, on 21 November 2017.

Air Albania was founded on 16 May 2018 by a consortium led by the Albanian and Turkish governments under a public–private partnership. Turkish Airlines, a founding partner, owns 49.12% of Air Albania. The remaining 50.88% is publicly traded, currently split between Albcontrol, a corporation owned by the Albanian government, with roughly 10%, and MDN Investment, a privately held company in Albania, with roughly 41% of shares. Albania's national competition authority cleared the airline's creation in September 2018. An A319 on lease from Turkish Airlines operated the airline's maiden flight in April 2019.

Controversy behind the airline's founding erupted when it was discovered that founding partner MDN Investment had been founded 9 days prior, on 7 May 2018. Turkish Airlines contributed 30 million dollars in their start-up. Moreover, on 16 May 2018, the Albanian government had given control of the land on which the Tirana International Airport was built to Albcontrol in order to participate in the public-private partnership. Due to lack of public comment, Albania may have violated the Stabilisation and Association Agreement it had signed during its accession process to the European Union.

Developments since 2020 
The European Union Aviation Safety Agency (EASA) granted Air Albania a Third Country Operator (TCO) certificate on 8 May 2020, permitting Air Albania to operate flights between Albania and the European Union. In September 2021, the airline added a third aircraft to its fleet for the first time.

On 9 September 2022, the Albanian authorities suspended the airline's business license as the airline failed to hand in necessary documentation, however it was allowed to continue all flight operations.

On 14 September 2022 Albanian authorities reactivated the business license as the airline brought all the necessary documentation and is continuing his operation in thirteen destinations in Europe.

Destinations 
, Air Albania flies to the following destinations:

Fleet

Current fleet 
, Air Albania operates the following aircraft:

Former aircraft 
Air Albania formerly also operated the following aircraft types:
 1 Boeing 737-800 (leased from Turkish Airlines)

Aircraft naming 
In recognition of notable Albanian personalities who have made positive contributions to Albanian culture and society, the airline names each aircraft after them, such as Lasgushi (Airbus A319-100) and Naimi (Airbus A320-200).

See also 
 Transport in Albania
 Arena Kombëtare

References

External links 

 Official website 

2018 establishments in Albania
Albanian brands
Airlines established in 2018
Airlines of Albania
Turkish Airlines
Turkish brands